Lester Dubins (April 27, 1920 – February 11, 2010) was an American mathematician noted primarily for his research in probability theory.  He was a faculty member at the University of California at Berkeley from 1962 through 2004, and in retirement was Professor Emeritus of Mathematics and Statistics.

It has been thought that, since classic red-and-black casino roulette is a game in which the house on average wins more than the gambler, that "bold play", i.e. betting one's whole purse on a single trial, is a uniquely optimal strategy.  While a graduate student at the University of Chicago, Dubins surprised his teacher Leonard Jimmie Savage with a mathematical demonstration that this is not true.  Dubins and Savage wrote a book that appeared in 1965 titled How to Gamble if You Must (Inequalities for Stochastic Processes) which presented a mathematical theory of gambling processes and optimal behavior in gambling situations, pointing out their relevance to traditional approaches to probability.  Under the influence of the work of Bruno de Finetti, Dubins and Savage worked in the context of finitely additive rather than countably additive probability theory, thereby bypassing some technical difficulties.

Dubins was the author of nearly a hundred scholarly publications.  Besides probability, some of these were on curves of minimal length under constraints on curvature and initial and final tangents (see Dubins path), Tarski's circle squaring problem, convex analysis, and geometry.

His doctoral students include Theodore Hill.

Publications
Dubins–Spanier theorems

References

External links

20th-century American mathematicians
21st-century American mathematicians
1920 births
2010 deaths
University of California, Berkeley College of Letters and Science faculty
Scientists from New York City
University of Chicago alumni
Probability theorists
Mathematicians from New York (state)
Fair division researchers